Gregory Alonza McCrary (March 24, 1952 – April 9, 2013) was an American football tight end in the National Football League for the Atlanta Falcons, Washington Redskins, and the San Diego Chargers.  He played college football at Clark Atlanta University and was drafted in the fifth round of the 1975 NFL Draft.

McCrary suffered a cardiac arrest on April 6, 2013 and died on April 9, 2013.

References

1952 births
2013 deaths
American football tight ends
Atlanta Falcons players
Clark Atlanta Panthers football players
San Diego Chargers players
Washington Redskins players
People from Griffin, Georgia
Players of American football from Georgia (U.S. state)